Allan Gorman (born 1947) is a visual art professional born in Brooklyn, New York , best known for his photorealistic paintings of objects within the industrial milieu, spanning from civil engineering structures to sophisticated mechanical devices and vehicles. Gorman's art work has been widely exhibited throughout the United States. He is also a former advertising executive, brand marketing educator, and consultant.

Career

In the 1970s Gorman worked as an advertising art director. He founded his own firm, what eventually became Brandspa, in 1987.

Largely self-taught, Gorman began painting in the early 1980s, while teaching advertising at the School of Visual Arts in New York City. Gorman's work has been profiled in The Huffington Post, Transportation Today, Manifest's International, New Painting Annual, America Art Collector, Poets & Artists Magazine, Chicago Fine Art and many other specialized publications and websites. Gorman often participates in art events, acting as an art curator, a juror or a board member. Gorman's awards for painting include a Residence fellowship to Vermont Studio Center (2011), the John Collins Memorial Award from the AAPL (2012), and the New Jersey Arts Council Fellowship
 A list of Gorman's art teachers includes Power Booth, Gary Godbee and David Kapp. 
In his previous career in the advertising and design communications industries (1970-2006), Gorman has worked at advertising agencies, including Young & Rubicam, Grey Advertising, Foote, Cone & Belding and others. Gorman opened his own advertising shop in 1987. He also acted as a past president of The Art Directors Club of NJ. In 2007 he was inducted into the New Jersey Advertising Club's Hall of Fame. More details of Gorman's career in advertising may be found in the May 4, 2015, issue of Motorcycle Magazine.

Allan Gorman was granted an artist residency at the Eileen Kaminski Foundation (ESKFF) at Mana Contemporary in 2016. In 2017 he was a curator of the exhibition "Industrialism in the 21st Century", at the Nicole Longnecker Gallery , Houston, TX.Interviews of the artist are available online. His works are represented at the European Museum of Modern Art.

Personal 
Gorman was born in Brooklyn. He is a resident of West Orange, New Jersey.

Memberships
American Artists Professional League
Studio Montclair
International Guild of Realism
Grandmasters of Fine Art

Gallery

Recent Awards

 2022 Individual Artist Fellowship Recipient for Painting - New Jersey State Council on the Arts
 2022 Best in Show - Grey Cube Gallery Online Exhibit
 2021 First Place Award - J Mane Gallery Cityscape
 2020 Achitectural Artist of the Year - ADC Gallery’s Art

2020 Pioneer of Realism Award - Spring Salon Online Exhibition, International Guild of Realism
2018 Best in Show - Fusion Art 3rd Annual Cityscape Competition
2015 - Still Life Artist of the Year - ADC Art Comes Alive!
2014 - Masterworks Museum Tour from the International Guild of Realism
2014 - John Collins Memorial Award for an Oil Painting - American Artists Professional League
2013 - New Jersey State Council on the Arts fellowship for Painting
2013 - Honorable Mention - WINNER'S GALLERY

Books

- Ten Marketing Secrets for Building a Sexier Brand

- Briefs for Building Better Brands: Tips, Parables and Insights for Market Leaders

Recent exhibitions
Gorman's solo exhibits and invitational art shows have taken place throughout the United States. Below is a partial list.

 2023 Allan Gorman - A Sense of Space - Atrium Gallery at Morristown - Morristown, NJ

 2022 Allan Gorman - Solo Exhibition - Artist Space Gallery (Online)
 2022 JCAST Open Studio - Mana Contemporary - Jersey City,
 2022 Clio Art Fair (Exhibiting Artist) - NY
 2022 NY Artfair 14C (Exhibiting Artist) - Jersey City Armory - Jersey City, NJ
 2020 Artfair 14C, The Other Art Fair/Brooklyn
 2021 Brooklyn Expo Center, Brooklyn, NY
 2020 Summer Reflections - Beacon Art-Shortwave Gallery - Stone Harbor, NJ

2020 LUSTER: Realism and Hyperrealism in Vehicle Art; ArteLibre's "20 Years in 20 × 20 Exhibition"
2020 Spring Salon Online Exhibition, International Guild of Realismm March 20 - May 20
2020 Men of Steel (with Jan Anders Nelson) - Nicole Longnecker Fine Art - Houston, TX  April–May 2020
2020 Studio Montclair Good Works - Jan 17 - Feb 21, Studio Montclair Gallery - Montclair, NJ 
2020 RED Exhibit - Novado Gallery - Jersey City, NJ   Feb. 14
2019 Structures and Seduction - JCAST 2019 Solo Exhibit - Jersey City, NJ
2015 Surfaces, Shapes and Spaces - Paintings by Allan Gorman - McGraw Gallery @ Newark, NJ
2015 ArtPrize 7 - Grand Rapids, MI
2015 ViewPoints, Studio Montclair's 18th Annual Open Juried Exhibition, Aljira Center, Newark, NJ (June 6)
2014 Ready to Rumble Road Show - A series of "pop-up" exhibits at Harley Davidson dealers in NY, NJ and PA from May - November
2015 ART FAIRS AND MUSEUM 2015 ArtPrize- Grand Rapids MI Former Madmen Who Make Art - The Belskie Museum - Closter NJ
2014 International Guild of Realism Masterworks Museum Tour - E.W. Norton Galleries - Shreveport LA; Ocala Museum of Art - Ocala FL; Albany Museum of Art - Albany GA
2014 ArtPrize 6 - Grand Rapids, MI
2015 NJ Member's Exhibition - Hunterdon Museum - Clinton NJ
2014 and 2012 Mid-Atlantic Oil Painting 2012 and 2014 at the UMW Galleries (Fredericksburg, VA)
2013 Revved Up and Ready to Rumble - Paintings by Allan Gorman - Azarian MCCullough Art Gallery at St Thomas Aquinas, Sparkill NY
2013 Abstractions in Reality - Allan Gorman Paintings - Holy Family University, Philadelphia PA
2014 Magic in the Machines - Paintings by Allan Gorman - Rotunda Art Gallery - J&J World Headquarters, New Brunswick, NJ
2013 Geometries & Reflections - Allan Gorman Paintings - Holy Family University, Philadelphia PA
2013 Hyperreal at Gallery 180 at The Illinois Institute of Art ( Jan 15 - 18 )
2013 Hillside Square Gallery, Montclair, NJ (May–September)
2013 Anthony Brunelli Fine Arts Gallery, NY (Salón 2, Feb 1)
2012 Sussex Country Community College Art Gallery (through February 27)
2012 Industrial Intrigue - Paintings by Allan Gorman - Gallery 50 Contemporary Art, Rehoboth Beach DE
2011 Parkinson Art Center, NJ. Oct 14–19, 2001
2011 Abstract Journeys - Paintings by Allan Gorman - Sussex County Community College Art Galleries, Newton NJ
2011 A digital age edward hopper
2011 Early Light by Montclair
2010 Arts Annual at the NJ State Museum (Trenton, NJ)
2010 Allan Gorman Paintings - Governor's Island Art Fair, NYC
2010 STRUCKtures! - Paintings by Allan Gorman - Phoenix Gallery, NYC

References

External links
Allan Gorman video - Solo painting exhibition - Artist Space Gallery - 2022
Allan Gorman official website

1947 births
Living people
American realist painters
21st-century American painters
21st-century American male artists
People from Brooklyn
People from West Orange, New Jersey
Artists from New Jersey
American male painters